The Devil's Partner is a 1923 American silent film directed by Caryl S. Fleming and starring Norma Shearer, Charles Delaney and Henry Sedley.

Cast
 Norma Shearer as Jeanne  
 Charles Delaney as Pierre  
 Henry Sedley as Henri, Jeanne's Father  
 Edward Roseman as Jules Payette  
 Stanley Walpole

References

Bibliography
 Jack Jacobs & Myron Braum. The films of Norma Shearer. A. S. Barnes, 1976.

External links

1923 films
American silent feature films
American black-and-white films
1920s English-language films
1920s American films